Izatha notodoxa is a moth of the family Oecophoridae. It is endemic to New Zealand, where it is known from the northern South Island.

The wingspan is 19–23 mm for males and 22–23 mm for females. Adults have been recorded in October, November and January.

Etymology
The name is a combination of the Greek notos (meaning the south or south-west wind) and apodoxa (referring to similar Izatha apodoxa), and refers to its more south-westerly distribution as compared to that species.

References

Oecophorinae